Komarovo is a municipal settlement in Kurortny District of the federal city of St. Petersburg, Russia, located on the Karelian Isthmus on the shore of the Gulf of Finland, and a station of the Saint Petersburg-Vyborg railroad. Population: 

During the summer months, the population increases by a factor of five to six.

Finnish history

Like many settlements located on the Karelian Isthmus on the Saint Petersburg-Vyborg railroad line, Kellomäki was vigorously developed in the late 19th – early 20th century at the height of the summer-resort boom. The original meaning of Kellomäki was "Bell Hill", named after a bell that was positioned on a sandy hill for the use of railroad workers. The bell notified of dinner break and the end of the workday. A railroad station opened near that spot on May 1, 1903, which is the unofficial date of Kellomäki's founding.

The Russian Orthodox church of the Holy Spirit was built in 1908, and burnt down in 1917. After that, a house chapel in one of the dachas served as church until the Soviet takeover. In 1916, about 800 dachas were counted in the settlement.

Among the well-known residents of Kellomäki before the Russian revolution were:
Leonid Andreyev – writer
George Borman – owner of a famous Saint Petersburg chocolate factory
Peter Carl Fabergé – jeweller
Mathilde Kschessinska – ballerina
 Augustin Reiche – speech therapist, had a facility for children at his dacha.
Anna Vyrubova – lady-in-waiting to the Romanov family

The development of summer-resort towns on the Karelian Isthmus was slowed down after Finland's declaration of independence in 1917. Many of the dachas were abandoned, and some 200 buildings were auctioned off, dismantled and rebuilt in other Finnish towns. An Émigré community formed in Kellomäki after the revolution as the White Russians fled to Finland. By the beginning of the Soviet-Finnish War, 167 families remained in the settlement – most of them were evacuated to Järvenpää during the Soviet-Finnish border negotiations in the fall of 1939. On November 30, 1939, after artillery bombardment, Kellomäki surrendered to Soviet troops without battle. Several buildings were destroyed, but overall the damage to the settlement was not serious.

Soviet and Russian history

The town was annexed to the Soviet Union in the Moscow Peace Treaty (1940). Standard houses manufactured in Finland on account of war reparations, were transported and assembled on the spot. Kellomäki was renamed to Komarovo in honor of botanist Vladimir Komarov, President of the Academy in 1948. Special resorts and dachas were also established for Writers, Composers, Theater and Cinema Workers. Land was set aside for Atomic Scientists as well.

Komarovo was built on this principle : people serve the state, the state pays back with rewards. And the principle was subverted by an aging lady: Anna Akhmatova. It turned out that there are more attractive values than those offered by the state. – Lev Lurye, historian.

Easily reachable from the city by elektrichka train, the settlement became home to many prominent figures in science and culture, members of the Saint Petersburg (then named Leningrad) intelligentsia.

Komarovo <...> was a place of both family relaxation and work. The settlement had developed its own daily routine. Usually, from the morning until six in the evening, people were busy with <scientific or cultural> work, and closer to seven, under the rays of warm evening sun, the unhurried stroll along the Kurortnaya street and the nearby paths took place. On this street they walked, discussed various topics with colleagues, talked about books, theater, and life, brought guests...

Since the 1990s, the academic and cultural traditions of Komarovo have been weakened, and currently, the New Russians and the well-to-dos of Saint Petersburg construct new villas here or redesign existing dachas purchased from the older residents.

In 2005 a nonprofit fund "Kellomaki-Komarovo" was founded. Some of the projects include building a new church, opening a museum, and preserving the yet unprotected forests.

Komarovo has served as a residence for government officials of Saint Petersburg, and still does today. Mayor Valentina Matviyenko lives here in the summer and commutes to the city.

Famous residents after 1940 by area of prominence

Literature
Fyodor Abramov – writer
Anna Akhmatova – poet
Joseph Brodsky – poet
Daniil Granin – writer
Lydia Chukovskaya – writer
Lydia Ginzburg – literary critic
Dmitry Likhachev – linguist
Vera Panova – writer
Evgeny Shvarts – playwright
Mikhail Slonimsky – writer
Arkady and Boris Strugatsky – science fiction writers
Ivan Yefremov – sci-fi writer and paleontologist

Visual arts
Nathan Altman – painter
Boris Piotrovsky – director of the Hermitage Museum

Classical and popular music
Boris Grebenshchikov – rock musician
Oleg Karavaychuk – composer
Sergey Kuryokhin – rock musician
Dmitri Shostakovich – classical composer
Vasily Solovyov-Sedoi – songwriter
Viktor Reznikov – musician

Science and Exploration
Zhores Alferov – physicist, Nobel laureate
Vladimir Fock – mathematician
Abram Ioffe – physicist
Vladimir Tuchkevich – physicist
Yuri Linnik – mathematician
Vladimir Komarov – botanist
Mikhail Somov – oceanologist
Vladimir Smirnov – mathematician
Aleksei Treshnikov – polar explorer
Ivan Yefremov – paleontologist and sci-fi writer

Theater and cinema
Aleksey Batalov – actor
Mikhail Boyarsky – actor
Nikolay Cherkasov – actor
Alisa Freindlich – actress
Grigori Kozintsev – film director
Andrey Krasko – actor
Innokenty Smoktunovsky – actor
Georgy Tovstonogov – theater director
Galina Ulanova – ballerina

Scenic features

Komarovo is renowned for its sandy beaches and dunes, scots pine, and spruce forests, and glacial lakes. Its residents and visitors enjoy cross-country skiing in the winter, and hiking, bicycling, fishing, wild mushroom, blueberry and raspberry picking in the summer. Its coastal stretch has been designated a protected zone: "Komarovo Shore Natural Reserve".

Remnants of the Winter War, such as trenches and dug-outs, can be seen in the surrounding forests.

Komarovo in popular culture
Komarovo became well known throughout the entire former USSR in the 1980s because of the popular song by Igor Sklyar: "На недельку, до второго, Я уеду в Комарово" ("For a week until the second [of the month], I will leave for Komarovo")

References

Notes

Sources
Kellomäki – Komarovo. Komarovo Municipal Council, Balashov et al. / Saint Petersburg: Izdatestvo "MKS", 2003. – 48pp. 

Komarovo Shore – Complex Natural Reserve.  edited by Volkova, Isachenko, Khramtsov. / Saint Petersburg, 2002. – 92pp.

External links
komarovo.spb.ru Official website of Komarovo 
Kellomäki-Komarovo – nonprofit fundraising organization dedicated to cultural and ecological preservation / development of Komarovo 
Komarovo History – includes numerous photographs 
Kellomäki – article on the Finnish period of the settlement's history by E.A. Balashov 
TV Program on Komarovo part 1  part 2 – complete transcript of a 2-part TV episode that includes interviews with many Soviet-era residents and their children. Part of the "Kультурный Cлой/Cultural Layer" program, led by historian Lev Lurye. 
"My Komarovo" New web-project about Komarovo 
Eccentrics of Bell Hill Recollections about Komarovo's famous Soviet-era residents. 

Municipal settlements under jurisdiction of Saint Petersburg
Kurortny District
Soviet culture
Culture in Saint Petersburg
Karelian Isthmus
Dachas